Huehnergard is a surname. Notable people with the surname include:

Paul Huehnergard, Canadian pair skater
Susan Huehnergard, Canadian pair skater, sister of Paul
John Huehnergard (born 1952), Canadian-American philologist and linguist